Lucie Hradecká was the defending champion, but chose not to participate.

Alison Riske won the title, defeating Iryna Brémond in the final, 6–1, 6–4.

Seeds

Main draw

Finals

Top half

Bottom half

References 
 Main draw
 Qualifying draw

Open Gdf Suez Nantes Atlantique - Singles